The 1948–49 season was the 46th season of competitive football in Belgium. RSC Anderlechtois won their second Premier Division title.
The Belgium national football team played 6 friendly games, of which they won 2 and drew 4.

Overview
At the end of the season, K Boom FC and RU Saint-Gilloise were relegated to Division I, while R Stade Louvain (Division I A winner) and RFC Brugeois (Division I B winner) were promoted to the Premier Division.
RCS La Forestoise, Stade Waremmien, SK Roeselare and RRC Tournaisien were relegated from Division I to Promotion, to be replaced by R Albert Elisabeth Club Mons, ASV Oostende KM, AS Herstalienne and RU Hutoise FC.

National team

* Belgium score given first

Key
 H = Home match
 A = Away match
 N = On neutral ground
 F = Friendly
 o.g. = own goal

Honours

Final league tables

Premier Division

Top scorer: René Thirifays (R Charleroi SC) with 26 goals.

References